Kaakka is a 2021 Malayalam-language Indian short film directed by Aju Ajeesh, starring Lakshmika Sajeevan in lead role, with Satish Ambadi, Ganga Surendran, Sreela Nalledam and Vipin Neel in supporting roles. The film released on 14 April 2021 with positive reviews, through Neestream had 6.1 million views, a rarity in Malayalam short film industry.

Summary

Kaakka emphasize the inner beauty of a person that makes her beautiful, and not about what is seen outside, her physical appearance, but beyond that makes life beautiful.

Cast

Lakshmika Sajeevan
Satish Ambadi
Ganga Surendran
Sreela Nalledam
Vipin Neel
Devasurya
Vinu Lavanaya
Mohammed Faizal
Sajith Thoppil
Abdul Latheef
shibu kuttan

Production
Vellithira, a WhatsApp group formed in 2016 decided to venture into film production, but their plan was derailed due to Kerala floods first and later due to Covid lockdown. Finally in November 2020, the crew completed the shooting in a single schedule. On 28 February 2021, Tony Lloyd Aruja, the cinematographer of the film died in an accident, as his bike skidded and his head hitting the divider.

References

External links
 

2021 films
2010s Malayalam-language films
Indian short films
Indian drama films
2021 short films
2021 drama films